Hydroxynaphthol blue is an azo dye. It is used for determining the endpoint in complexometric titrations/Metal Titration.

References

Azo dyes
Naphthalenesulfonates
Organic sodium salts
2-Naphthols